This is a list of DVD releases relating to the Channel 4/HBO TV series Da Ali G Show.

Season releases
All season DVD releases are 2-disc sets, unless otherwise indicated.

Compilation releases

All compilation DVD releases are single-disc, unless otherwise indicated.

Feature film releases
All feature film DVD releases are single-disc, unless otherwise indicated.

Related releases

Home video releases
Ali G Show, Da